Aleksandra Živojinović (born 22 September 1995) is a Serbian pop-folk singer. She rose to prominence after her participation in the 2013 televised singing competition Zvezde Granda, where she finished fourth. Prijović has released two albums to date, Testament (2017) and Zvuk tišine (2022). She is considered the most popular singer of the Grand Production, and one of the most popular singers in the country.

Life and career 
Born in Sombor, Serbia and grew up in Beli Manastir in Croatia and Bačka Topola, as a child, she showed a talent for singing. She performed at school performances and social events. At the age of thirteen, she recorded two songs, "Majko" and "Boli svaka tvoja reč", for the production company Mega Sound, whose owner was Mića Nikolić. 

She perticiped on Serbian singing competition show Zvezde Granda 2012–13. In 2013, she won fourth place, where she was awarded the song "Još večeras plakaću za tobom". In the same year, she also recorded the duet "Ma pusti ponos" with the winner of the season, Amar Jašarspahić. The following year, she achieved great success with the song "Za nas kasno je", since the song was chosen as one of the biggest hits in Serbia of 2015. In December 2015, she recorded the duet "Šta bi" with MC Stojan and released the music video for it. At the end of May 2016, she released the song "Totalna anestezija", which achieved exceptional success since it reached 50 million views on YouTube. Already on October 25 of the same year, she presented the song "Senke", which was listened to a million times on YouTube in 24 hours, which broke the record on the Serbian music scene.

The first single from her debut studio album Testament was the title track with which Prijović started the promotion of the album, released on June 6, 2017. The song became the most popular on the album, in addition to the singles that Prijović previously recorded and included on the album. The media claim that Prijović with this album is more and more reminiscent of the style of turbo-folk star Ceca. YouTube banned the viewing of the provocative sado-masochistic music video for the song "Separe" by those under the age of 18. Prijović came into the public spotlight when she revealed her relationship with Filip Živojinović, the son of Slobodan Živojinović and the stepson of Lepa Brena. The couple got married on June 21, 2018 in Belgrade. They had a son, Aleksandar, on February 6, 2019. After a short musical break, Prijović came back on the stage with 2 new songs: "Neponovljivo" and "Legitimno". She released her second studio album, Zvuk tišine, in 2022.

Discography

Studio albums

Singles

As lead artist

As featured artist

Promotional singles

Other appearances

Filmography

Television

Music videos

References

External links
 
 

1995 births
Living people
People from Sombor
Musicians from Sombor
21st-century Serbian women singers
Grand Production artists
Serbian folk-pop singers